Soth Phetrasy (1915–2004) was a leading official of the Pathet Lao, the communist guerrilla movement of Laos associated with the Lao People's Party, during the 1960s and 1970s.

Biography

Soth Phetrasy was born in 1915.

Phetrasy was an important figure to the Pathet Lao (Land of Lao) as he became spokesman for them in Vientiane from 1964. He became increasingly known as he tried to negotiate POW's between the United States and also matters such as Eugene DeBruin, and as diplomat of the Pathet Lao preparing the 1973 Vientiane Agreement.

Phetrasy was a minister in the third and final leftist and royalist coalition government of Laos from 1973 to 1975, serving as Minister for Economy and Planning under Souvanna Phouma. He was the managing director of Bank of the Lao P.D.R. from 1980 to 1983. He later became the ambassador of Laos to the Soviet Union. His son, Sousath, owner of the Mali Guest House in Phonsavan in Northern Laos, died, on 25 September 2009.

Phetrasy died in Vientiane, Laos in 2004.

Footnotes

See also
Souvanna Phouma

1915 births
2004 deaths
Governors of the Bank of the Lao P.D.R.
Government ministers of Laos
Lao People's Revolutionary Party politicians
People from Vientiane
Ambassadors of Laos to the Soviet Union